Frankie Dean may refer to:

Franko Fraize, a British rapper from Thetford
Frankie Osborne, a fictional character on British soap opera Hollyoaks

See also
Frank Dean (disambiguation)